Samson Ngoepe (born 28 January 1985) is a South African runner who specializes in the 800 metres. He is currently coached by Charl Naude.

He competed in the 800 metres event at the 2008 Olympic Games, disappointingly not reaching the final.

He qualified to run the 800 metres at the 2009 World Championships in Athletics held in Berlin, Germany from 15 to 23 August 2009 by running a personal best time of 1:45.17 min in Ostrava, Czech Republic on June 17 of 2009. At these championships he reached the semi finals of the competition.

Personal bests
800 metres  - 1:45.17 min   (2009) in Ostrava.
1500 metres - 3:40.40 min (2008) in Nijmegen.

His personal best time of 1:45.17 minutes, was achieved in June 2009 in Ostrava.

Competition record

References

External links 
Samson Ngoepe at Sports Reference

South African male middle-distance runners
Athletes (track and field) at the 2008 Summer Olympics
Olympic athletes of South Africa
1985 births
Living people
People from Polokwane
Sportspeople from Limpopo
Athletes (track and field) at the 2007 All-Africa Games
African Games competitors for South Africa